Victory is the third studio album by American hip hop group Do or Die. It was released on March 14, 2000 via Rap-A-Lot Records. Recording sessions took place at Hippie House Studios and Knock Hard Studio in Houston, at Sound On Sound and Soundtrack Studios in New York, at Creator's Way Studios and Darkside Recordings in Chicago, at Right Track Studios in Los Angeles, and at Enterprise Studios in Burbank. Production was handled by Mr. Lee, Day Rock, Irv Gotti, JB Money, Mike Dean, Mike Dunn, The Legendary Traxster, and member A.K. It features guest appearances from Snypaz, Feloney, Hussein Fatal, Ja Rule, Johnny P. and Mo Unique. The album peaked at number 13 on the Billboard 200 and number 4 on the Top R&B/Hip-Hop Albums in the United States.

Track listing

Personnel

Dennis "AK47" Round – vocals, producer (tracks: 2-4, 7, 9, 10, 12, 17)
Anthony "N.A.R.D." Round – vocals
Darnell "Belo Zero" Smith – vocals
Charles "Chilla" Paxton – vocals (tracks: 2, 13)
Iren "2-4" Moore – vocals (track 2)
John "Johnny P" Pigram – vocals (track 4)
Monique Moy – vocals (track 9)
Feloney Davis – vocals (track 10)
Jeffrey "Ja Rule" Atkins – vocals (track 14)
Bruce "Hussein Fatal" Washington – vocals (track 15)
Tony Redd – additional vocals (track 4)
Casey Abernathy – additional vocals (track 9)
Swing – additional vocals (track 10)
Malcolm "E.D.I." Greenidge – additional vocals (track 16)
Rufus "Young Noble" Cooper III – additional vocals (track 16)
Earl "E-40" Stevens – additional vocals (track 17)
Leroy "Mr. Lee" Williams Jr. – producer (tracks: 1-3, 5, 7, 8, 13, 15, 16), engineering
Derek Wayne "Day Rock" Bass – producer (tracks: 4, 9)
Mike Dunn – producer (track 10)
Irving "Irv Gotti" Lorenzo – producer (tracks: 11, 14)
Samuel "The Legendary Traxster" Lindley – producer (track 12), mixing
Joe "J.B. Money" Bythewood – producer (track 14)
Mike Dean – producer (track 17)
Micah Harrison – engineering
Mike Hengeli – engineering
Ryan Smith – engineering
Bryan Stanley – mixing
Pat Viala – mixing
Tom Coyne – mastering
James A. Smith – executive producer
Jeff Battson – artwork, design, layout
Michael Benabib – photography
Anzel "Red Boy" Jennings – A&R
Tony "Big Chief" Randle – A&R
Brian Leach – A&R
Jesse Jones – A&R
Ray Gregory – A&R

Charts

References

External links

2000 albums
Do or Die (group) albums
Rap-A-Lot Records albums
Albums produced by Irv Gotti
Albums produced by The Legendary Traxster
Albums produced by Mike Dean (record producer)